Preston on Stour is a village and civil parish in Warwickshire, England.

History
It is situated some four kilometres south of the town of Stratford-upon-Avon. The population of the civil parish as at the 2011 census was 244. As its name suggests, the village stands on the River Stour, which flows northward, just east of the village centre. The A3400 main road parallels the river about one kilometre further east. To the east of the village lies the country estate of Alscot Park with its Grade I listed Georgian mansion house. Historically Preston was a part of the county of Gloucestershire but the parish was transferred to Warwickshire on 1 April 1931. The village church is dedicated to Saint Mary. The village formerly had a Junior school and Infant school but this was closed in 1974. Notable locals include Judy Craymer, producer of the Mamma Mia! film franchise.

Nearby
The children's television show Teletubbies was filmed at Wimpstone, about two kilometres south of the village.

References

External links

Villages in Warwickshire
Civil parishes in Warwickshire
Stratford-on-Avon District